Orrin is a census-designated place and unincorporated community in Pierce County, North Dakota, United States. Its population was 22 as of the 2010 census.

Old Saint John Nepomocene Cemetery, Wrought-Iron Cross Site and St. Mathias Cemetery, Wrought-Iron Cross Site, both in or near Orrin, are listed on the National Register of Historic Places.

Geography
Orrin is located at  (48.091389, −100.163056).

Demographics

2010 census
As of the census of 2010, there were 22 people, 5 households, and 5 families residing in the CDP. The racial makeup of the CDP was 77.3% White, and 22.7% African American.

There were 5 households, of which 80.0% had children under the age of 18 living with them, 40.0% were married couples living together, 20.0% had a female householder with no husband present, and 40.0% had a male householder with no wife present. 0.0% of all households were made up of individuals. The average household size was 4.40 and the average family size was 4.20.

The median age in the CDP was 17.3 years. 59.1% of residents were under the age of 18; 4.5% were between the ages of 18 and 24; 18.2% were from 25 to 44; 9.1% were from 45 to 64; and 9.1% were 65 years of age or older. The gender makeup of the CDP was 63.6% male and 36.4% female.

Education
It is within Rugby Public Schools, which operates Rugby High School.

References

Census-designated places in Pierce County, North Dakota
Census-designated places in North Dakota
Unincorporated communities in North Dakota
Unincorporated communities in Pierce County, North Dakota